The Fokker B.II was a prototype sesquiplane shipboard reconnaissance flying boat built in the Netherlands in 1923.

Development
It was a conventional flying boat with a duralumin hull and sesquiplane wings braced with N-struts. The tractor configuration engine was mounted on the leading edge of the upper wing driving a four-bladed propeller. Open cockpits were provided for the crew under the upper wing and in a dorsal position amidships.

The Royal Dutch Navy tested the prototype, but no production orders followed.

Specifications

References

 
 

1920s Dutch military reconnaissance aircraft
Flying boats
B 02 (1923)
Single-engined tractor aircraft
Sesquiplanes
Aircraft first flown in 1923